Paracalamus is an extinct genus of prehistoric bony fish that lived during the Upper Miocene subepoch.

See also

 Prehistoric fish
 List of prehistoric bony fish

References

Prehistoric perciform genera
Miocene fish